The Karakoram Wildlife Sanctuary, also known as the Karakoram (Nubra Shyok) Wildlife Sanctuary or the Karakoram (Saichen Shyok) Wildlife Sanctuary is a high altitude wildlife sanctuary located in the easternmost reaches of the Karakoram range in Leh district, in the Indian union territory of Ladakh. It is an important wildlife sanctuary due to being one of the few places in India with a migratory population of the Chiru or Tibetan Antelope.

About 
The Karakoram Wildlife Sanctuary, established in 1987, is managed by the Wildlife Warden in Kargil, Ladakh. It is classified as IUCN protected area (category IV) by the World Conservation Monitoring Centre. The Botanical Survey of India has called the wildlife sanctuary as an "under explored area with regards to botanical knowledge". Karakoram Wildlife Sanctuary could become the "transboundary counterpart" of the Central Karakoram National Park in Gilgit Baltistan. If the Karakoram Wildlife Sanctuary is linked to the Siachen Peace Park, it could become a World Heritage Site.

Biodiversity 

Being a cold desert area, the vegetation in Karakoram Wildlife Sanctuary is quite sparse. However, the ecological marginal conditions have employed some remarkable characteristics in these vegetation, which has high medicinal properties. 

This Wildlife Sanctuary has been extensively surveyed by Chandra Prakash Kala for distribution of vegetation, including plants of medicinal values, across the environmental gradient and habitat types. Fifteen rare and endangered medicinal plant species have been discovered by CP Kala from this sanctuary, which are distributed over different habitat types. Arnebia euchroma, Bergenia stracheyi, Ephedra gerardiana, and Hyoscymus Niger are the threatened but medicinally important plants occur in this wildlife sanctuary.

References 

Leh district
Wildlife sanctuaries in Ladakh
1987 establishments in Jammu and Kashmir
Protected areas established in 1987